Konvalinka (feminine: Konvalinková) is a Czech language surname, literally meaning Convallaria flower (lily of the valley). The surname may refer to:

Petr Konvalinka, rector of the Czech Technical University in Prague
Kateřina Konvalinka Průšová, Czech female model
Naďa Konvalinková, Czech actor

Czech-language surnames